The 3rd Cabinet of North Korea was elected by the 1st Session of the 3rd Supreme People's Assembly on 23 October 1962. It was replaced on 16 December 1967 by the 4th Cabinet.

Members

References

Citations

Bibliography
Books:
 

3rd Supreme People's Assembly
Cabinet of North Korea
1962 establishments in North Korea
1967 disestablishments in North Korea